The Press Complaints Commission (PCC) was a voluntary regulatory body for British printed newspapers and magazines, consisting of representatives of the major publishers. The PCC closed on Monday 8 September 2014, and was replaced by the Independent Press Standards Organisation (IPSO), chaired by Sir Alan Moses. Unlike the UK's only 'Approved Regulator' Independent Monitor for the Press (IMPRESS) who are fully compliant with the recommendations of the Leveson Inquiry, IPSO has refused to seek approval to the Press Recognition Panel (PRP).

The PCC was funded by the annual levy it charged newspapers and magazines. It had no legal powers – all newspapers and magazines voluntarily contributed to the costs of, and adhered to the rulings of, the commission, making the industry self-regulating.

The PCC received extensive criticism for its lack of action in the News of the World phone hacking affair, including from MPs and Prime Minister David Cameron, who called for it to be replaced with a new system in July 2011. The Leveson Inquiry was set up and reported in November 2012 but there since has been deadlock over its proposals for self-regulation despite the establishment of a Royal Charter on self-regulation of the press.

Lord Hunt was appointed Chairman of the Commission in October 2011.
In December 2011 Lord Hunt announced his plans to replace the PCC with a new independent regulator.

Hunt also wants to introduce a voluntary, paid-for, 'kitemarking' system for blogs. The kitemark would indicate that the blogger has agreed to strive for accuracy, and to be regulated. Bloggers would lose their kitemark if complaints against them were repeatedly upheld. He plans to start the roll-out by targeting bloggers that cover current affairs.

When asked about his proposals in an interview Hunt said "At the moment, it is like the Wild West out there. We need to appoint a sheriff."

Chairs
 Lord Wakeham (1995–2002)
 Professor Robert Pinker (2002)
 Sir Christopher Meyer (2003–2009)
 Baroness Buscombe (2009–2011)
 Lord Hunt of Wirral (2011–2014)

History

The precursor to the PCC was the Press Council, a voluntary press organisation founded in 1953 with the aim of maintaining high standards of ethics in journalism. However, in the late 1980s, several newspapers breached these standards and others were unsatisfied with the effectiveness of the council. The Home Office thus set up a departmental committee, headed by Sir David Calcutt, to investigate whether a body with formal legal powers should be created to regulate the industry.

The report, published in June 1990, concluded that a voluntary body, with a full, published code of conduct should be given eighteen months to prove its effectiveness. Should it fail, the report continued, a legally empowered body would replace it. Members of the press, keen to avoid external regulation, established the Press Complaints Commission and its Code of Practice.

The first high-profile case handled by the PCC was brought by the Duke of York who claimed that the press were invading the privacy of his small children. The complaint was upheld.

The commission's first chairman was Lord McGregor of Durris. He was succeeded by Lord Wakeham in 1995. He resigned in January 2002 after concerns over a conflict of interest when the Enron Corporation collapsed. He had been a member of the company's audit committee. Sir Christopher Meyer was appointed in 2002 following a brief period of interim chairmanship by Professor Robert Pinker, leaving in 2008.

In 2006, the PCC received 3,325 complaints from members of the public. Around two-thirds of these were related to alleged factual inaccuracies, one in five related to alleged invasions of privacy and the rest included the lack of right to reply, harassment and obtaining information using covert devices. 90% of cases were resolved to the complainants' satisfaction. 31 of the cases were adjudicated by the commission before being resolved as the complainants were initially not satisfied by the action recommended by the commission.

In 2009 the PCC received more than 25,000 complaints, a record number, after an article appeared in the Daily Mail written by Jan Moir about the death of Boyzone singer Stephen Gately. Moir had described events leading up the death as "sleazy" and "less than respectable". On 17 February the PCC confirmed that although it was "uncomfortable with the tenor of the columnist's remarks", it would not uphold the complaints made.

As of 12 January 2011, the Northern and Shell group (often referred to as the Express Group) of publications withdrew its subscription to the PCC. According to the PCC, "a refusal to support the self-regulatory system financially means that a newspaper publisher effectively withdraws from the PCC's formal jurisdiction, which the PCC considers regrettable". Consequently, the Daily & Sunday Express, Scottish Daily & Sunday Express, Daily & Sunday Star, OK!, New magazine and Star magazine are no longer bound by the PCC's code of practice, and the public no longer has recourse to making complaints through the PCC.

The Guardian newspaper reported in May 2011 that social media messages are to be brought under the remit of the PCC after it ruled in February 2011 that information posted on Twitter should be considered public and publishable by newspapers.

The Code of Practice
Any member of the public, whether a relative unknown or a high-profile figure, is able to bring a complaint against a publication that had volunteered to meet the standards of the Code. Members of the Commission adjudicate whether the Code has indeed been broken, and, if so, suggest appropriate measures of correction. These have included the printing of a factual correction, an apology or letters from the original complainant. The Commission does not impose financial penalties on newspapers found to have broken the Code.

Many publishers have added clauses to the contracts of editors of newspapers and magazines giving them the option to dismiss editors who are judged to have breached the PCC Code of Practice. The PCC and its adherents claim that by attaching personal significance to the role of the PCC in the editors' mind, its role has become more effective.

The section titles of the code of practice on which judgements are made are as follows:

It is worth noting that reporting restrictions imposed by judges take precedence over the PCC's code. For example, under the Sexual Offences Act 1992, victims (even alleged victims) of sexual offences have lifetime anonymity. This means that a newspaper cannot print any particulars leading to the identification of a sexual offence victim.

Criticism
In 2001, Labour MP Clive Soley said that "other regulatory bodies are far stronger, far more pro-active and really do represent the consumer. There are no consumer rights people on the PCC and that is a major failing".

Journalist Nick Davies criticised the PCC for failing to investigate the vast majority of complaints on technical grounds in his book Flat Earth News (2008), an exposé of modern British newspaper journalism. The MediaWise Trust, a charitable organisation set up to help people in their dealings with the press says that the self-regulation system has proved to help the rich but not the poor.

Phone hacking
In February 2010 the commission was described as "toothless" by the House of Commons Culture, Media and Sport Select committee investigating the News of the World phone hacking affair.

During a House of Commons emergency debate into the same affair on 6 July 2011, MPs described the PCC as 'well-meaning but a joke', and as much use as 'a chocolate teapot'.

In a press conference on 8 July 2011, Prime Minister David Cameron described the PCC as 'inadequate' and 'absent' during the phone hacking affair, and implied that the organisation would have to be reformed or replaced.

Self-regulation
The 2009 British investigative documentary Starsuckers exposed the request to obtain medical records of celebrities by many of the red-top UK tabloids, and the lack of PCC action against the papers that had broken the PCC charter. The tabloids ran the bogus stories about the likes of Amy Winehouse, Pixie Geldof and Guy Ritchie. Secretly interviewed reporters claimed that "the PCC is run by the newspaper Editors", "Getting a PCC isn't great, but, a lot of papers just brush it aside, all it is, is a little apology somewhere in the paper, you get a slap on the wrist, you get reported by the PCC, but there's no money". The PCC took no action against the papers that ran these stories but did respond with a letter to the Editor of The Belfast Telegraph. The response of Chris Atkins, the documentary's director, was that the PCC had yet still not acted on the issue of several newspapers breaking their Code of conduct 8.2.

Funding
On 24 August 2011, the New Left Project published an article by Julian Petley, arguing that the PCC is "not, and never has been, a regulator": he presents the case that the PCC is the equivalent of the customer services department of any large corporate organisation, responding to customer complaints for most of the British press. The PCC responded to this article on their own website, asserting that the PCC is a regulatory organisation which very regularly intervenes "proactively and pre-publication to prevent tabloid and broadsheet stories appearing" and Jonathan Collett asserts that this method has an "almost 100% success rate". Petley responded to Collett in the New Left Project on 26 August, asserting that the PCC "lacks sufficient sanctions to be able to punish effectively those who breach its Code" and that the problem is not the PCC but its funding (See Press Standards Board of Finance.)

See also

Advertising Standards Authority (United Kingdom)
British Board of Film Classification
National Institute on Media and the Family
Ofcom – the British telecommunications and broadcasting regulator.
News International phone hacking scandal
Phone hacking scandal reference lists
Council for Mass Media in Finland

References

External links
PCC homepage
The Code of Practice under which the PCC makes its decisions
Recent adjudications of the PCC (published into the public domain)

Battle to raise standards, BBC News, 7 February 2001, report on the first ten years of the PCC
The MediaWise Trust

Mass media complaints authorities
Regulators of the United Kingdom
1990s establishments in the United Kingdom
Organizations established in 1990
2014 disestablishments in the United Kingdom
Organizations disestablished in 2014
Self-regulatory organisations in the United Kingdom
Consumer organisations in the United Kingdom